Vanche Shikov (born 19 July 1985) is a former Macedonian footballer.

Club career
Born in Kavadarci, Macedonia, Shikov started his football career at FK Tikvesh.

In 2002, he went to play for Greek side Skoda Xanthi where he has played 55 games and scored two goals. In 2006, he was bought by Olympiacos but was loaned out to Kerkyra F.C. for five months where he played 13 games scoring two goals, against Egaleo F.C. on 4 February 2007 and against Ergotelis F.C. on 29 April 2007. At the end of the loan deal between Olympiacos and Kerkyra, on 13 May, he was officially signed as a player of Olympiacos in Athens.

After spending three years in Cyprus with Ethnikos Achna, Šikov signed a three-year deal with Ukrainian club Volyn Lutsk in the summer of 2011.

Neftchi Baku
On 20 June 2016, Santin signed with Neftchi Baku, before having his contract terminated by mutual consent on 16 December 2016.

International career
He made his senior debut for Macedonia in a November 2005 friendly match against Iran and has earned a total of 58 caps, scoring 4 goals. His final international was a June 2017 FIFA World Cup qualification match against Spain.

Career statistics

International

International goals

References

External links
 
Profile at Macedonian Football

1985 births
Living people
Sportspeople from Kavadarci
Association football central defenders
Macedonian footballers
North Macedonia under-21 international footballers
North Macedonia international footballers
FK Tikvesh players
Xanthi F.C. players
FK Pobeda players
A.O. Kerkyra players
Apollon Pontou FC players
Ethnikos Achna FC players
FC Volyn Lutsk players
FK Austria Wien players
Neftçi PFK players
FK Rabotnički players
FC Tobol players
Akademija Pandev players
Macedonian First Football League players
Super League Greece players
Cypriot First Division players
Ukrainian Premier League players
Austrian Football Bundesliga players
Azerbaijan Premier League players
Kazakhstan Premier League players
Macedonian expatriate footballers
Expatriate footballers in Greece
Macedonian expatriate sportspeople in Greece
Expatriate footballers in Cyprus
Macedonian expatriate sportspeople in Cyprus
Expatriate footballers in Ukraine
Macedonian expatriate sportspeople in Ukraine
Expatriate footballers in Austria
Macedonian expatriate sportspeople in Austria
Expatriate footballers in Azerbaijan
Macedonian expatriate sportspeople in Azerbaijan
Expatriate footballers in Kazakhstan
Macedonian expatriate sportspeople in Kazakhstan